Crambus delineatellus is a moth in the family Crambidae. It was described by George Hampson in 1896. It is found in Brazil.

References

Crambini
Moths described in 1896
Moths of South America